Skrbeńsko  is a village in Gmina Godów, Wodzisław County, Silesian Voivodeship, southern Poland. It has a population of 817 and lies on the border with the Czech Republic.

It was established in 1775 as a colony within Gołkowice, Silesian Voivodeship by Maksymilian von Skrbenski, and year later formed a separate municipality.

Villages in Wodzisław County